Gideon Obhakhan is a Nigerian politician and the immediate past commissioner for education in Edo State. He contested for the House of Representatives during the 2015 general election.

Early life and education 
Gideon Obhakhan was born in Ekpoma, Edo State, Nigeria. He attended Emaudo Primary School, Ekpoma, before proceeding to Annunciation Catholic College, Irrua for his secondary education thereafter proceeded to the University of Benin where he obtained bachelor's degree in Electronic and electrical Engineering. He bagged his masters in communication engineering from the University of Lagos before proceeding to University of Leicester, United Kingdom for an MBA.

Career and politics 
Obhakhan worked with private telecommunications companies such as Mobitel and  EMIS telecommunication before joining MTN Nigeria as managing director, Planning and Strategy.

Obhakhan contested for the House of Representatives election in the 2015 general election under the umbrella of All Progressive Congress (APC). He lost to the opposition party's candidate, Joe Edionwele of the Peoples Democratic Party(PDP). He was appointed as the commissioner for education by the then Governor of Edo State, Adams Oshiomhole. During the 2020 gubernatorial elections in Edo State, the  candidate of the Peoples Democratic Party candidate appointed him as director of Research, Ize-Iyamo Campaign Organisation.

Personal life 
Obhakhan is a Christian and is married.

References 

Edo State politicians
Alumni of the University of Leicester
Year of birth missing (living people)
Living people